Perles is a locality located in the municipality of Fígols i Alinyà, in Province of Lleida province, Catalonia, Spain. As of 2020, it has a population of 29. Elevation is 793m (2,602 ft). Perles is located 119km northeast of Lleida.

References

Populated places in the Province of Lleida